Li Na was the defending champion, but chose not to compete after winning the French Open singles title the previous week.

Sabine Lisicki won the title, defeating Daniela Hantuchová in the final 6–3, 6–2.

Seeds 
The top eight seeds received a bye into the second round.

Draw

Finals

Top half

Section 1

Section 2

Bottom half

Section 3

Section 4

Qualifying

Seeds

Qualifiers

Draw

First qualifier

Second qualifier

Third qualifier

Fourth qualifier

Fifth qualifier

Sixth qualifier

Seventh qualifier

Eighth qualifier

References 
 Main draw
 Qualifying draw

Aegon Classic - Singles
Singles